The 2019 Houston Astros season was the 58th season for the Major League Baseball (MLB) franchise in Houston, Texas, their 55th as the Astros, seventh in both the American League (AL) and AL West division, and 20th at Minute Maid Park.

The Houston Astros announced after last season that their weekly night games will air on KTRH 740.

On September 18, the Astros clinched a postseason berth against the Texas Rangers and became the first team since the 2002–2004 New York Yankees to have three consecutive 100-win seasons, having done so in 2017 and 2018 as well. On September 22, the Astros clinched their third straight AL West title. For the first time in franchise history, the Astros finished the season with the best record in baseball and defeated the Tampa Bay Rays in the Division Series by a margin of three games to two. They then defeated the New York Yankees in the American League Championship Series (ALCS) by a margin of four games to two, winning the pennant and a trip to the World Series for the second time in three years. However, they were defeated by the Washington Nationals in seven games in the World Series.

Despite the World Series upset, this Astros team is still considered to have put together one of the best regular seasons, and most talented rosters, in the history of baseball, owing largely to its historic 107-win campaign, lion's share of season-end accolades, and record-breaking individual stats.

Following the season, the Astros led the league with a record six players selected to 2019's inaugural All-MLB Team. Earlier in the year, they also once again sent six players (a franchise record four of whom were starters) to the 2019 All-Star Game, the most from any team in baseball. When including All-Star ace Zack Greinke, who was traded from Arizona to Houston at the July trade deadline, this iteration of the Astros had an eye-popping total of seven 2019 All-Stars on its postseason squad, among the most in baseball history. As such, the 2019 Astros are often regarded as one of the greatest baseball teams ever assembled.

Justin Verlander, having led the MLB in wins, went on to clinch his second American League Cy Young Award after an all-time historically dominant season alongside strikeout and ERA leader Gerrit Cole. Yordan Alvarez also won Rookie of the Year after a history-making season, while Alex Bregman finished as a runner-up for the AL MVP.

This was the Astros' final season with A. J. Hinch as manager and Jeff Luhnow as general manager; both were fired in January 2020 after MLB investigators confirmed that the team had used electronics to steal opponents’ signs back in the 2017 regular season.

Off-season 
On March 24, 2019, the Astros signed right-handed pitcher Justin Verlander to a two-year, $66 million contract extension to keep him with Houston through the 2021 season.

Regular season

Game log 

|- style="text-align:center; background:#cfc"
| 1 || March 28 || @ Rays || 5–1 || Verlander (1–0) || Snell (0–1) || — || 25,025 || 1–0 || W1
|- style="text-align:center; background:#fbb"
| 2 || March 29 || @ Rays || 2–4 || Morton (1–0) || Cole (0–1) || Alvarado (1) || 13,059 || 1–1 || L1
|- style="text-align:center; background:#fbb"
| 3 || March 30 || @ Rays || 1–3 || Glasnow (1–0) || McHugh (0–1) || Alvarado (2) || 16,010 || 1–2 || L2
|- style="text-align:center; background:#fbb"
| 4 || March 31 || @ Rays || 1–3 || Chirinos (1–0) || Miley (0–1) || Castillo (1) || 18,473 || 1–3 || L3
|- style="text-align:center; background:#cfc"
| 5 || April 1 || @ Rangers || 2–1 || Peacock (1–0) || Sampson (0–1) || Osuna (1) || 18,056 || 2–3 || W1
|- style="text-align:center; background:#fbb"
| 6 || April 2 || @ Rangers || 4–6 || Kelley (2–0) || Valdez (0–1) || Leclerc (2) || 17,907 || 2–4 || L1
|- style="text-align:center; background:#fbb"
| 7 || April 3 || @ Rangers || 0–4 || Minor (1–1) || Cole (0–2) || – || 22,265 || 2–5 || L2
|- style="text-align:center; background:#cfc"
| 8 || April 5 || A's || 3–2 || McHugh (1–1) || Montas (1–1) || Osuna (2) || 43,165 || 3–5 || W1
|- style="text-align:center; background:#cfc"
| 9 || April 6 || A's || 6–0 || Miley (1–1) || Brooks (1–1) || — || 34,487 || 4–5 || W2
|- style="text-align:center; background:#cfc"
| 10 || April 7 || A's || 9–8 || Osuna (1–0) || Treinen (0–1) || — || 34,902 || 5–5 || W3
|- style="text-align:center; background:#cfc"
| 11 || April 8 || Yankees || 4–3 || Pressly (1–0) || Ottavino (1–1) || Osuna (3) || 27,631 || 6–5 || W4
|- style="text-align:center; background:#cfc"
| 12 || April 9 || Yankees || 6–3 || Rondón (1–0) || Green (0–2) || Osuna (4) || 31,009 || 7–5 || W5
|- style="text-align:center; background:#cfc"
| 13 || April 10 || Yankees || 8–6 || McHugh (2–1) || Paxton (1–2) || Pressly (1) || 27,685 || 8–5 || W6
|- style="text-align:center; background:#cfc"
| 14 || April 12 || @ Mariners || 10–6 || Peacock (2–0) || Armstrong (0–1) || Osuna (5) || 30,969 || 9–5 || W7
|- style="text-align:center; background:#cfc"
| 15 || April 13 || @ Mariners || 3–1 || Verlander (2–0) || Hernández (1–1)|| Osuna (6) || 30,533 || 10–5 || W8
|- style="text-align:center; background:#cfc"
| 16 || April 14 || @ Mariners || 3–2 || Cole (1–2) || Brennan (0–1) || Osuna (7) || 29,237 || 11–5 || W9
|- style="text-align:center; background:#cfc"
| 17 || April 16 || @ Athletics || 9–1 || McHugh (3–1) || Estrada (0–2) || — || 12,270 || 12–5 || W10
|- style="text-align:center; background:#fbb"
| 18 || April 17 || @ Athletics || 1–2 || Montas (3–1) || Miley (1–2) || Treinen (6) || 11,323 || 12–6 || L1
|- style="text-align:center; background:#cfc"
| 19 || April 19 || @ Rangers || 7–2 || Verlander (3–0) || Smyly (0–2) || — || 35,649 || 13–6 || W1
|- style="text-align:center; background:#fbb"
| 20 || April 20 || @ Rangers || 4–9 || Kelley (3–0) || Cole (1–3) || — || 39,636 || 13–7 || L1
|- style="text-align:center; background:#fbb"
| 21 || April 21 || @ Rangers || 10–11 || Miller (1–1) || McHugh (3–2) || Kelley (1) || 26,225 || 13–8 || L2
|- style="text-align:center; background:#fbb"
| 22 || April 22 || Twins || 5–9 || Odorizzi (2–2) || Peacock (2–1) || — || 34,518 || 13–9 || L3
|- style="text-align:center; background:#cfc"
| 23 || April 23 || Twins || 10–4 || Rondón (2–0) || Hildenberger (2–1) || — || 29,409 || 14–9 || W1
|- style="text-align:center; background:#cfc"
| 24 || April 24 || Twins || 7–1 || Verlander (4–0) || Stewart (0–1) || — || 26,582 || 15–9 || W2
|- style="text-align:center; background:#fbb"
| 25 || April 25 || Indians || 1–2 || Bauer (3–1) || Cole (1–4) || Hand (7) || 24,948 || 15–10 || L1
|- style="text-align:center; background:#fbb"
| 26 || April 26 || Indians || 3–6 || Cimber (2–1) || Rondón (2–1) || Hand (8) || 38,084 || 15–11 || L2
|- style="text-align:center; background:#cfc"
| 27 || April 27 || Indians || 4–3  || Osuna (2–0) || Cimber (2–2) || — || 38,667 || 16–11 || W1
|- style="text-align:center; background:#cfc"
| 28 || April 28 || Indians || 4–1 || Valdez (1–1) || Carrasco (2–3) || Pressly (2) || 31,025 || 17–11 ||W2
|- style="text-align:center; background:#fbb"
| 29 || April 29 || @ Twins || 0–1 || Odorizzi (3–2) || Verlander (4–1) || Parker (6) || 12,615 || 17–12 || L1
|- style="text-align:center; background:#cfc"
| 30 || April 30 || @ Twins || 11–0 || Cole (2–4) || Pineda (2–2) || — || 12,181 || 18–12 || W1
|-

|- style="text-align:center; background:#fbb"
| 31 || May 1 || @ Twins || 2–6 || Pérez (4–0) || McHugh (3–3) || — || 14,115 || 18–13 || L1
|- style="text-align:center; background:#fbb"
| 32 || May 2 || @ Twins || 2–8 || Berríos (5–1) || Peacock (2–2)|| — || 17,721 || 18–14 || L2
|- style="text-align:center; background:#cfc"
| 33 || May 4 || @ Angels || 14–2 || Miley (2–2) || Cahill (1–3) || — || 18,177 || 19–14 || W1
|- style="text-align:center; background:#cfc"
| 34 || May 5 || @ Angels || 10–4 || Verlander (5–1) || Harvey (1–3) || — || 17,614 || 20–14 || W2
|- style="text-align:center; background:#cfc"
| 35 || May 6 || Royals || 6–4 || Cole (3–4) || Junis (3–3) || Osuna (8) || 27,079 || 21–14 || W3
|- style="text-align:center; background:#fbb"
| 36 || May 7 || Royals || 2–12 || Duffy (1–1) || McHugh (3–4) || — || 30,377 || 21–15 || L1
|- style="text-align:center; background:#cfc"
| 37 || May 8 || Royals || 9–0 || Peacock (3–2) || López (0–4) || — || 22,698 || 22–15 || W1
|- style="text-align:center; background:#cfc"
| 38 || May 9 || Rangers || 4–2 || Miley (3–2) || Minor (3–3) || Osuna (9) || 26,657 || 23–15 || W2
|- style="text-align:center; background:#cfc"
| 39 || May 10 || Rangers || 3–0 || Verlander (6–1) || Lynn (4–3) || Osuna (10) || 33,023 || 24–15 || W3
|- style="text-align:center; background:#cfc"
| 40 || May 11 || Rangers || 11–4 || Cole (4–4) || Smyly (0–3) || — || 35,849 || 25–15 || W4
|- style="text-align:center; background:#cfc"
| 41 || May 12 || Rangers || 15–5 || Martin (1–0) || Sampson (0–3) || — || 41,027 || 26–15 || W5
|- style="text-align:center; background:#cfc"
| 42 || May 13 || @ Tigers || 8–1 || Peacock (4–2) || Boyd (4–3) || — || 15,086 || 27–15 || W6
|- style="text-align:center; background:#cfc"
| 43 || May 14 || @ Tigers || 11–4 || Miley (4–2) || Carpenter (0–2) || — || 14,261 || 28–15 || W7
|- style="text-align:center; background:#cfc"
| 44 || May 15 || @ Tigers || 5–1 || Verlander (7–1) || Soto (0–2) || — || 15,940 || 29–15 || W8
|- style="text-align:center; background:#cfc"
| 45 || May 17 || @ Red Sox || 3–1 || Harris (1–0) || Porcello (3–4) || Osuna (11) || 35,558 || 30–15 || W9
|- style="text-align:center; background:#cfc"
| 46 || May 18 || @ Red Sox || 7–3 || James (1–0) || Velázquez (1–3) || — || 36,887 || 31–15 || W10
|- style="text-align:center; background:#fbb"
| 47 || May 19 || @ Red Sox || 3–4 || Walden (6–0) || Valdez (1–2) || Workman (1) || 35,796 || 31–16 || L1
|- style="text-align:center; background:#cfc"
| 48 || May 20 || White Sox || 3–0 || Peacock (5–2) || Burr (1–1) || Osuna (12) || 24,364 || 32–16 || W1
|- style="text-align:center; background:#cfc"
| 49 || May 21 || White Sox || 5–1 || Verlander (8–1) || Covey (0–3) || — || 31,392 || 33–16 || W2
|- style="text-align:center; background:#fbb"
| 50 || May 22 || White Sox || 4–9 || Nova (3–4) || Cole (4–5) || — || 30,237 || 33–17 || L1
|- style="text-align:center; background:#fbb"
| 51 || May 23 || White Sox || 0–4 || Giolito (6–1) || Martin (1–1) || — || 26,073 || 33–18 || L2
|- style="text-align:center; background:#cfc"
| 52 || May 24 || Red Sox || 4–3 || Miley (5–2) || Sale (1–6) || Osuna (13) || 35,606 || 34–18 || W1
|- style="text-align:center; background:#cfc"
| 53 || May 25 || Red Sox || 4–3 || Osuna (3–0) || Barnes (2–1) || — || 40,722 || 35–18 || W2
|- style="text-align:center; background:#fbb"
| 54 || May 26 || Red Sox || 1–4 || Rodríguez (5–3) || Verlander (8–2) || Walden (1) || 41,502 || 35–19 || L1
|- style="text-align:center; background:#cfc"
| 55 || May 27 || Cubs || 6–5 || Cole (5–5) || Hamels (4–1) || Osuna (14) || 42,135 || 36–19 || W1
|- style="text-align:center; background:#cfc"
| 56 || May 28 || Cubs || 9–6 || James (2–0) || Lester (3–4) || Osuna (15) || 31,030 || 37–19 || W2
|- style="text-align:center; background:#fbb"
| 57 || May 29 || Cubs || 1–2 || Hendricks (5–4) || Miley (5–3) || Cishek (5) || 33,243 || 37–20 || L1
|- style="text-align:center; background:#cfc"
| 58 || May 31 || @ A's || 3–2 ||Rondón (3–1) || Trivino (2–2) || Osuna (16) || 14,519 || 38–20 || W1
|-

|- style="text-align:center; background:#cfc"
| 59 || June 1 || @ A's || 5–1 || Verlander (9–2) || Anderson (6–4) || — || 20,425 || 39–20 || W2
|- style="text-align:center; background:#cfc"
| 60 || June 2 || @ A's || 6–4  || James (3–0) || Trivino (2–3) || — || 23,144 || 40–20 || W3
|- style="text-align:center; background:#cfc"
| 61 || June 3 || @ Mariners || 4–2 || Valdez (2–2) || Gearrin (0–2) || Pressly (3) || 11,825 || 41–20 || W4
|- style="text-align:center; background:#cfc"
| 62 || June 4 || @ Mariners || 11–5 || Guduan (1–0) || Brennan (2–4) || — || 12,208 || 42–20 || W5
|- style="text-align:center; background:#fbb"
| 63 || June 5 || @ Mariners || 1–14 || Leake (5–6) || Peacock (5–3) || — || 13,652 || 42–21 || L1
|- style="text-align:center; background:#cfc"
| 64 || June 6 || @ Mariners || 8–7  || Devenski (1–0) || Festa (0–1) || — || 20,258 || 43–21 || W1 
|- style="text-align:center; background:#cfc"
| 65 || June 7 || Orioles || 4–3  || Pérez (1–0) || Kline (1–3) || — || 35,414 || 44–21 || W2
|- style="text-align:center; background:#fbb"
| 66 || June 8 || Orioles || 1–4 || Fry (1–3) || Harris (1–1) || Castro (2) || 38,425 || 44–22 || L1
|- style="text-align:center; background:#cfc"
| 67 || June 9 || Orioles || 4–0 || Miley (6–3) || Bundy (3–7) || Osuna (17) || 35,621 || 45–22 || W1
|- style="text-align:center; background:#cfc"
| 68 || June 11 || Brewers || 10–8 ||Peacock (6–3) || Peralta (3–3) || — || 35,928 || 46–22 || W2
|- style="text-align:center; background:#fbb"
| 69 || June 12 || Brewers || 3–6 (14) || Houser (2–1) || Pérez (1–1) || — || 40,032 || 46–23 || L1
|- style="text-align:center; background:#cfc"
| 70 || June 14 || Blue Jays || 15–2 || Cole (6–5) || Sanchez (3–8) || Armenteros (1) || 34,719 || 47–23 || W1
|- style="text-align:center; background:#cfc"
| 71 || June 15 || Blue Jays || 7–2 || Valdez (3–2) || Richard (0–3) || — || 38,012 || 48–23 || W2
|- style="text-align:center; background:#fbb"
| 72 || June 16 || Blue Jays || 0–12 || Thornton (2–5) || Peacock (6–4) || — || 42,174 || 48–24 || L1
|- style="text-align:center; background:#fbb"
| 73 || June 17 || @ Reds || 2–3 || Castillo (7–1) || Miley (6–4) || Lorenzen (3) || 22,745 || 48–25 || L2
|- style="text-align:center; background:#fbb"
| 74 || June 18 || @ Reds || 3–4 || DeSclafani (4–3) || Verlander (9–3) || Lorenzen (4) || 25,347 || 48–26 || L3
|- style="text-align:center; background:#fbb"
| 75 || June 19 || @ Reds || 2–3 || Bowman (1–0) || Osuna (3–1) || — || 24,777 || 48–27 || L4
|- style="text-align:center; background:#fbb"
| 76 || June 20 || @ Yankees || 6–10 || Cortes Jr. (2–0) || Valdez (3–3) || Chapman (20) || 41,030 || 48–28 || L5
|- style="text-align:center; background:#fbb"
| 77 || June 21 || @ Yankees || 1–4 || Paxton (5–3) || Peacock (6–5) || Chapman (21) || 41,166 || 48–29 || L6
|- style="text-align:center; background:#fbb"
| 78 || June 22 || @ Yankees || 5–7 || Holder (5–2) || Pressly (1–1) || Britton (3) || 46,304 || 48–30 || L7
|- style="text-align:center; background:#cfc"
| 79 || June 23 || @ Yankees || 9–4 || Verlander (10–3) || Happ (7–4) || — || 46,769 || 49–30 || W1
|- style="text-align:center; background:#cfc"
| 80 || June 25 || Pirates || 5–1 || Cole (7–5) || Williams (2–2) || — || 37,193 || 50–30 || W2
|- style="text-align:center; background:#fbb"
| 81 || June 26 || Pirates || 2–14 || Agrazal (1–0) || Valdez (3–4) || — || 39,312 || 50–31 || L1
|- style="text-align:center; background:#fbb"
| 82 || June 27 || Pirates || 0–10 || Musgrove (6–7) || Peacock (6–6) || — || 38,943 || 50–32 || L2
|- style="text-align:center; background:#cfc"
| 83 || June 28 || Mariners || 2–1  || Harris (2–1) || Festa (0–2) || — || 32,828 || 51–32 || W1
|- style="text-align:center; background:#cfc"
| 84 || June 29 || Mariners || 6–5  || Devenski (2–0) || Elías (2–1) || — || 35,082 || 52–32 || W2
|- style="text-align:center; background:#cfc"
| 85 || June 30 || Mariners || 6–1 || Cole (8–5) || Gonzales (9–7) || — || 32,485 || 53–32 || W3
|-

|- style="text-align:center; background:#cfc"
| 86 || July 2 || @ Rockies || 9–8 || Harris (3–1) || McGee (0–1) || Osuna (18) || 47,864 || 54–32 || W4
|- style="text-align:center; background:#cfc"
| 87 || July 3 || @ Rockies || 4–2 || Miley (7–4) || Lambert (2–1) || Osuna (19) || 48,308 || 55–32 || W5
|- style="text-align:center; background:#fbb"
| 88 || July 5 || Angels || 4–5 || Peña (6–2) || Verlander (10–4) || Robles (12) || 41,219 || 55–33 || L1
|- style="text-align:center; background:#cfc"
| 89 || July 6 || Angels || 4–0 || Cole (9–5) || Heaney (1–3) || — || 39,470 || 56–33 || W1
|- style="text-align:center; background:#cfc"
| 90 || July 7 || Angels || 11–10  || Pressly (2–1) || Cole (0–1) || — || 37,264 || 57–33 || W2
|- style="text-align:center; background:#bff;"
| ASG || July 9 || NL @ AL || 4–3 || Tanaka (1–0) || Kershaw (0–1) || Chapman (1) || 36,747 || 57–33 || N/A
|- style="text-align:center; background:#bff;"
| colspan="10" |Representing the Astros: Alex Bregman, George Springer, Michael Brantley, Justin Verlander, Gerrit Cole & Ryan Pressly 
|- style="text-align:center; background:#fbb"
| 91 || July 11 || @ Rangers || 0–5 || Lynn (12–4) || Valdez (3–5) || — || 37,964 || 57–34 || L1
|- style="text-align:center; background:#fbb"
| 92 || July 12 || @ Rangers || 8–9 || Kelley (5–2) || Osuna (3–2) || — || 32,322 || 57–35 || L2
|- style="text-align:center; background:#cfc"
| 93 || July 13 || @ Rangers || 7–6  || James (4–0) || Martin (1–1) || Osuna (20) || 42,452 || 58–35 || W1
|- style="text-align:center; background:#cfc"
| 94 || July 14 || @ Rangers || 12–4 || Verlander (11–4) || Jurado (5–5) || — || 27,916 || 59–35 || W2
|- style="text-align:center; background:#fbb"
| 95 || July 15 || @ Angels || 6–9 || Anderson (3–0) || Valdez (3–6) || Robles (14) || 35,431 || 59–36 || L1
|- style="text-align:center; background:#fbb"
| 96 || July 16 || @ Angels || 2–7 || Ramirez (4–1) || Rondón (3–2) || — || 42,678 || 59–37 || L2
|- style="text-align:center; background:#cfc"
| 97 || July 17 || @ Angels || 11–2 || Cole (10–5) || Peña (7–3) || — || 35,738 || 60–37 || W1
|- style="text-align:center; background:#cfc"
| 98 || July 18 || @ Angels || 6–2 || Miley (8–4) || Harvey (3–5) || — || 35,928 || 61–37 || W2
|- style="text-align:center; background:#cfc"
| 99 || July 19 || Rangers || 4–3 || Verlander (12–4) || Minor (8–5) || Osuna (21) || 42,287 || 62–37 || W3
|- style="text-align:center; background:#cfc"
| 100 || July 20 || Rangers || 6–1 || Urquidy (1–0) || Jurado (5–6) || — || 41,643 || 63–37 || W4
|- style="text-align:center; background:#cfc"
| 101 || July 21 || Rangers || 5–3 || Armenteros (1–0) || Lynn (12–6) || Osuna (22) || 37,655 || 64–37 || W5
|- style="text-align:center; background:#cfc"
| 102 || July 22 || A's || 11–1 || Cole (11–5) || Bailey (8–7) || — || 41,534 || 65–37 || W6
|- style="text-align:center; background:#fbb"
| 103 || July 23 || A's || 3–4  || Petit (3–2) || McHugh (3–5) || — || 39,204 || 65–38 || L1
|- style="text-align:center; background:#cfc"
| 104 || July 24 || A's || 4–2 || Verlander (13–4) || Bassitt (7–4) || Osuna (23) || 41,838 || 66–38 || W1
|- style="text-align:center; background:#fbb"
| 105 || July 26 || @ Cardinals || 3–5 || Miller (4–4) || Pressly (2–2) || Martínez (10) || 44,724 || 66–39 || L1
|- style="text-align:center; background:#cfc"
| 106 || July 27 || @ Cardinals || 8–2 || Cole (12–5) || Ponce de Leon (1–1) || — || 46,518 || 67–39 || W1
|- style="text-align:center; background:#cfc"
| 107 || July 28 || @ Cardinals || 6–2 || Miley (9–4) || Hudson (10–5) || — || 46,714 || 68–39 || W2
|- style="text-align:center; background:#cfc"
| 108 || July 30 || @ Indians || 2–0 || Verlander (14–4) || Bieber (10–4) || Osuna (24) || 21,589 || 69–39 || W3
|- style="text-align:center; background:#fbb"
| 109 || July 31 || @ Indians || 4–10 || Plesac (6–3) || Urquidy (1–1) || — || 23,961 || 69–40 || L1
|-

|- style="text-align:center; background:#cfc"
| 110 || August 1 || @ Indians || 7–1 || Cole (13–5) || Salazar (0–1) || — || 21,536 || 70–40 || W1
|- style="text-align:center; background:#cfc"
| 111 || August 2 || Mariners || 10–2 || Miley (10–4) || Kikuchi (4–8) || — || 41,444 || 71–40 || W2
|- style="text-align:center; background:#cfc"
| 112 || August 3 || Mariners || 9–0 || Sanchez (4–14) || Gonzales (12–9) || — || 37,059 || 72–40 || W3
|- style="text-align:center; background:#cfc"
| 113 || August 4 || Mariners || 3–1 || Verlander (15–4) || Milone (1–6) || Osuna (25) || 39,667 || 73–40 || W4
|- style="text-align:center; background:#cfc"
| 114 || August 6 || Rockies || 11–6 || Greinke (11–4) || Gonzalez (0–4) || — || 43,243 || 74–40 || W5
|- style="text-align:center; background:#cfc"
| 115 || August 7 || Rockies || 14–3 || Cole (14–5) || Lambert (2–3) || — || 35,566 || 75–40 || W6
|- style="text-align:center; background:#cfc"
| 116 || August 9 || @ Orioles || 3–2 || Miley (11–4) || Bundy (5–12) || Osuna (26) || 19,407 || 76–40 || W7
|- style="text-align:center; background:#cfc"
| 117 || August 10 || @ Orioles || 23–2 || Sanchez (5–14) || Brooks (2–6) || — || 21,903 || 77–40 || W8
|- style="text-align:center; background:#fbb"
| 118 || August 11 || @ Orioles || 7–8 || Bleier (3–0) || Osuna (3–3) || — || 17,979 || 77–41 || L1
|- style="text-align:center; background:#bbb"
| — || August 12 || @ White Sox || colspan="7" | Postponed (Inclement Weather, makeup date on August 13) 
|- style="text-align:center; background:#cfc"
| 119 || August 13 || @ White Sox || 6–2 || Greinke (12–4) || Cease (2–5) || — || N/A || 78–41 || W1
|- style="text-align:center; background:#fbb"
| 120 || August 13 || @ White Sox || 1–4 || Nova (8–9) || Devenski (2–1) || — || 19,559 || 78–42 || L1
|- style="text-align:center; background:#fbb"
| 121 || August 14 || @ White Sox || 9–13 || Colomé (4–2) || Pressly (2–3) || — || 18,899 || 78–43 || L2
|- style="text-align:center; background:#fbb"
| 122 || August 15 || @ A's || 6–7 || Diekman (1–6) || Devenski (2–2) || Hendriks (14) || 15,323 || 78–44 || L3
|- style="text-align:center; background:#fbb"
| 123 || August 16 || @ A's || 2–3  || Trivino (4–5) || Sneed (0–1) || — || 22,768 || 78–45 || L4
|- style="text-align:center; background:#fbb"
| 124 || August 17 || @ A's || 4–8 || Bassitt (9–5) || Armenteros (1–1) || — || 21,428 || 78–46 || L5
|- style="text-align:center; background:#cfc"
| 125 || August 18 || @ A's || 4–1 || Greinke (13–4) || Anderson (10–9) || Osuna (27) || 22,372 || 79–46 || W1
|- style="text-align:center; background:#cfc"
| 126 || August 19 || Tigers || 5–4 || Miley (12–4) || Jackson (3–6) || Osuna (28) || 40,499 || 80–46 || W2
|- style="text-align:center; background:#cfc"
| 127 || August 20 || Tigers || 6–3 || Peacock (7–6) || Turnbull (3–12) || Osuna (29) || 30,143 || 81–46 || W3
|- style="text-align:center; background:#fbb"
| 128 || August 21 || Tigers || 1–2 || Farmer (5–4) || Verlander (15–5) || Jiménez (4) || 29,567 || 81–47 || L1
|- style="text-align:center; background:#cfc"
| 129 || August 22 || Tigers || 6–3 || Cole (15–5) || Zimmermann (1–9) || Osuna (30) || 27,220 || 82–47 || W1
|- style="text-align:center; background:#cfc"
| 130 || August 23 || Angels || 5–4 || Greinke (14–4) || Suárez (2–5) || Osuna (31) || 35,201 || 83–47 || W2
|- style="text-align:center; background:#cfc"
| 131 || August 24 || Angels || 5–2 || Miley (13–4) || Peters (3–2) || Harris (1) || 37,862 || 84–47 || W3
|- style="text-align:center; background:#cfc"
| 132 || August 25 || Angels || 11–2 || Valdez (4–6) || Barría (4–7) || — || 38,989 || 85–47 || W4
|- style="text-align:center; background:#cfc"
| 133 || August 27 || Rays || 15–1 || Verlander (16–5) || Morton (13–6) || — || 28,454 || 86–47 || W5
|- style="text-align:center; background:#cfc"
| 134 || August 28 || Rays || 8–6 || Harris (4–1)|| Castillo (2–8) || — || 25,539 || 87–47 || W6
|- style="text-align:center; background:#fbb"
| 135 || August 29 || Rays || 8–9 || De León (1–0) || Devenski (2–3) || Pagán (15) || 33,051 || 87–48 || L1
|- style="text-align:center; background:#cfc"
| 136 || August 30 || @ Blue Jays || 7–4 || McHugh (4–5) || Thornton (4–9) || — || 25,289 || 88–48 || W1
|- style="text-align:center; background:#fbb "
| 137 || August 31 || @ Blue Jays || 4–6 || Buchholz (1–3) || Valdez (4–7) || Giles (18) || 26,414 || 88–49 || L1
|-

|- style="text-align:center; background:#cfc"
| 138 || September 1 || @ Blue Jays || 2–0 || Verlander (17–5) || Giles (2–3) || — || 24,104 || 89–49 || W1
|- style="text-align:center; background:#cfc"
| 139 || September 2 || @ Brewers || 3–2  || Osuna (4–3) || Guerra (8–5) || James (1) || 39,046 || 90–49 || W2
|- style="text-align:center; background:#fbb"
| 140 || September 3 || @ Brewers || 2–4 || Lyles (10–8) || Greinke (14–5) || Hader (28) || 29,335 || 90–50 || L1
|- style="text-align:center; background:#cfc"
| 141 || September 5 || Mariners || 11–9  || James (5–0) || Wisler (3–4) || — || 27,822 || 91–50 || W1
|- style="text-align:center; background:#cfc"
| 142 || September 6 || Mariners || 7–4 || Smith (1–0) || Milone (3–9) || Osuna (32) || 33,149 || 92–50 || W2
|- style="text-align:center; background:#cfc"
| 143 || September 7 || Mariners || 2–1 || Verlander (18–5) || Adams (1–2) || Harris (2) || 41,958 || 93–50 || W3
|- style="text-align:center; background:#cfc"
| 144 || September 8 || Mariners || 21–1 || Cole (16–5) || Hernández (1–6) || — || 35,569 || 94–50 || W4
|- style="text-align:center; background:#cfc"
| 145 || September 9 || A's || 15–0 || Greinke (15–5) || Fiers (14–4) || — || 38,289 || 95–50 || W5
|- style="text-align:center; background:#fbb"
| 146 || September 10 || A's || 7–21 || Roark (10–8) || Miley (13–5) || Mengden (1) || 32,100 || 95–51 || L1
|- style="text-align:center; background:#fbb"
| 147 || September 11 || A's || 3–5 || Anderson (12–9) || James (5–1) || Hendriks (20) || 32,938 || 95–52 || L2
|- style="text-align:center; background:#fbb"
| 148 || September 12 || A's || 2–3 || Bailey (13–8) || Verlander (18–6) || Hendriks (21) || 34,024 || 95–53 || L3
|- style="text-align:center; background:#cfc"
| 149 || September 13 || @ Royals || 4–1 || Cole (17–5) || Fillmyer (0–2) || Osuna (33) || 20,593 || 96–53 || W1
|- style="text-align:center; background:#cfc"
| 150 || September 14 || @ Royals || 6–1 || Greinke (16–5) || Montgomery (3–9) || — || 20,716 || 97–53 || W2
|- style="text-align:center; background:#cfc"
| 151 || September 15 || @ Royals || 12–3 || Miley (14–5) || Junis (9–14) || — || 17,205 || 98–53 || W3
|- style="text-align:center; background:#cfc"
| 152 || September 17 || Rangers || 4–1 || Verlander (19–6) || Lynn (14–11) || Osuna (34) || 39,650 || 99–53 || W4
|- style="text-align:center; background:#cfc"
| 153 || September 18 || Rangers || 3–2 || Cole (18–5) || Allard (4–1) || Osuna (35) || 38,417 || 100–53 || W5
|- style="text-align:center; background:#cfc"
| 154 || September 20 || Angels || 6–4 || Greinke (17–5) || Barría (4–10) || Osuna (36) || 40,106 || 101–53 || W6
|- style="text-align:center; background:#fbb"
| 155 || September 21 || Angels || 4–8 || Bard (3–2) || Miley (14–6) || — || 43,264 || 101–54 || L1
|- style="text-align:center; background:#cfc"
| 156 || September 22 || Angels || 13–5 || Verlander (20–6) || Rodríguez (0–1) || — || 43,169 || 102–54 || W1
|- style="text-align:center; background:#cfc"
| 157 || September 24 || @ Mariners || 3–0 || Cole (19–5) || Milone (4–10) || Osuna (37) || 11,259 || 103–54 || W2
|- style="text-align:center; background:#cfc"
| 158 || September 25 || @ Mariners || 3–0 || Greinke (18–5) || Kikuchi (6–11) || Harris (3) || 10,916 || 104–54 || W3
|- style="text-align:center; background:#fbb"
| 159 || September 26 || @ Angels || 3–4  || Cahill (4–9) || Biagini (3–2) || — || 39,658 || 104–55 || L1
|- style="text-align:center; background:#cfc"
| 160 || September 27 || @ Angels || 4–0 || Urquidy (2–1) || Sandoval (0–4) || — || 41,763 || 105–55 || W1
|- style="text-align:center; background:#cfc"
| 161 || September 28 || @ Angels || 6–3 || Verlander (21–6) || Bard (3–3) || Osuna (38) || 35,814 || 106–55 || W2
|- style="text-align:center; background:#cfc"
| 162 || September 29 || @ Angels || 8–5 || Cole (20–5) || Peters (4–4) || Harris (4) || 34,693 || 107–55 || W3
|-

|-
| Legend:       = Win       = Loss       = Game postponed     Bold = Astros team member

Season standings
American League West

Record against opponents

Summary

March and April
In the March 28 contest versus the Tampa Bay Rays, Justin Verlander made his 11th career Opening Day start, and second consecutive for the Astros, earning a 5–1 victory versus reigning Cy Young Award winner Blake Snell.

On April 3 versus the Texas Rangers, Carlos Correa collected the 500th hit of his career.

In April 9 game against the New York Yankees, José Altuve connected for his 100th career home run off Jonathan Loáisiga in a 6–3 win.  Altuve became the 16th player in Astros history to reach 100 home runs.  On April 12, Altuve connected for his second career grand slam, and first since 2014, in a 10–6 win over the Seattle Mariners.  He hit another home run the next night off Félix Hernández, homering for the fifth consecutive game and sixth home run in that span.  Altuve was the first Astro to hit a home run in five consecutive games since Morgan Ensberg's franchise-record six consecutive games in 2006.  Verlander, the starting pitcher, struck out eight of the first 10 batters that he faced and 11 of 20 overall.  He allowed one run in six innings.

June
On June 9, Yordan Álvarez made his major league debut versus the Baltimore Orioles.  He went 1-for-3 with a two-run home run in his debut.  The following game, Álvarez again homered, this time versus Matt Albers of the Milwaukee Brewers.  He became the first Astro to homer in both of his first two games.

Álvarez became the fourth player in MLB history to hit four home runs in his first five career games when he homered off Clayton Richard of the Toronto Blue Jays, joining Trevor Story, Yasiel Puig and Mike Jacobs. On June 23, Álvarez hit a 2-run home run for his seventh home run of the season in only 12 games, establishing an Astros franchise record.  He also became the first player in MLB history to drive in 16 runs in his first 12 games.

July
Yuli Gurriel became the first Astro to score a run and RBI in seven consecutive games, and the fifth to homer in five consecutive games on July 7, including a game-tying grand slam in an 11–10 win versus the Los Angeles Angels.  He won the AL Player of the Week Award for the week ending July 8, his second weekly honor.  He homered six times in all five of the Astros games, collecting nine hits with an OPS of 1.812.

During a contest versus the St. Louis Cardinals on July 28, José Altuve homered for his 1,500th career hit, one of three hits in a 6–2 win that afternoon, in his 1,190th career game.  The only players in the divisional play era to reach the milestone faster were Ichiro Suzuki, Wade Boggs, Kirby Puckett, Nomar Garciaparra, Tony Gwynn and Derek Jeter.

For the month of July, Gurriel batted .398, .427 OBP, .837 SLG, 18 runs scored, seven doubles, 12 home runs, 31 RBIs over 24 games.

August
On August 3, MLB named three Astros as winners of all three monthly awards for July, including Yuli Gurriel as AL Player of the Month, Gerrit Cole as AL Pitcher of the Month, and Yordan Álvarez as AL Rookie of the Month.

On August 4, Verlander struck out 10 batters over 6 innings in a 3–1 win over the Seattle Mariners.  With this 10-K performance, Verlander surpassed 200 strikeouts in a season for the ninth time in his career.  He joined Nolan Ryan, Randy Johnson, Roger Clemens, Tom Seaver, Pedro Martinez, and Bob Gibson as the only pitchers with nine or more seasons of 200+ strikeouts.  All but Clemens and Verlander (ineligible at the time due to still being active) were in the Hall of Fame.

In a 14–3 romp over the Colorado Rockies on August 7, Gurriel homered and tied J. R. Towles with eight RBIs for the club record in one game.

The Astros set a franchise record with 23 runs scored on August 10 at Camden Yards versus the Baltimore Orioles,  In the 23–2 win, they also set the franchise record for extra base hits with 13, including six home runs.  Three of the home runs came via rookie Yordan Álvarez, including a grand slam.  With a career-high seven runs driven in, his total stood at 51 to establish the major league record for the first 45 games.

On August 15, Carlos Correa hit his 100th career home runs in 7–6 loss to the Athletics at Oakland Coliseum.  He joined Cal Ripken Jr. and Alex Rodriguez as the only major league shortstops to hit 100 career home runs before their 25th birthday.  He was also the youngest Astro to hit the milestone home run.

September
In the September 1 contest versus the Toronto Blue Jays at Rogers Centre, Justin Verlander pitched his third career no-hitter.  He allowed one base-runner, a walk to Cavan Biggio in the first inning, and struck out 14 batters.  The Astros' only runs came on a two-run home run by Abraham Toro in the top of the ninth inning.  This was Verlander's second career no-hitter against the Blue Jays, making him just the third pitcher of the modern era to no-hit the same team twice, and the first to pitch both no-hitters against the same team on the road.  He is the sixth pitcher to throw three or more no-hitters in his career.  On September 7, Verlander continued his domanance, reaching 32 consecutive batters retired, a streak that established an Astros franchise record and was tied by teammate Ryan Pressly in 2022.

On September 8, Gerrit Cole struck out 15 batters over eight innings in a 2–1 victory over the Seattle Mariners.  He became just the second pitcher to strike out 14 or more hitters in three consecutive games, joining Pedro Martínez in 1999.  It was the sixth outing of the season of at least 10 strikeouts and no walks for Cole, tying the major league record.  The 15 strikeouts tied Verlander's Minute Maid Park record, set earlier in the season on June 12 versus the Brewers.  It was Cole's 12 consecutive decision won, dating back to May 27, with the Astros going 16–2 in those 18 starts.

On September 18 versus Texas, Cole struck out his 300th batter of the season, his victim being Shin-Soo Choo in a 3–2 win.  Cole became the third Astros pitcher to reach the milestone in a single season, following J. R. Richard (303 in 1978 and 313 in 1979) and Mike Scott (306 in 1986).  Cole was the 18th pitcher in major league history to attain this feat, and he became the second-fastest pitcher to register 300 strikeouts in terms of innings pitched.  His  innings trailed only Randy Johnson, who achieved the feat in  innings in 2001.  This win, also being the Astros' 100th of the season, clinched at least a share of Wild Card berth.  They became the sixth team in history to win at least 100 games in each of three consecutive seasons. On September 22, they formally clinched the AL West title, their third straight division title and first three-peat since the 1997-99 seasons.

On September 28, Verlander struck out Kole Calhoun of the Los Angeles Angels to register both his 3000th career strikeout and 300th on the season.  Verlander and Cole became the second teammate duo since Randy Johnson and Curt Schilling with the 2002 Arizona Diamondbacks to reach 300 strikeouts.

The Astros also clinched home field advantage throughout the MLB postseason on September 28.

Álvarez' .655 slugging percentage (SLG) and 1.067 on-base plus slugging percentage (OPS) were both the highest in history for a qualified rookie, exceeding Shoeless Joe Jackson's 1.058 OPS during his 1911 rookie campaign (minimum 350 plate appearances).

 In the clubhouse after their ALCS victory,  Houston assistant general manager Brandon Taubman taunted female reporters. The team initially denied a Sports Illustrated report about his behavior, and accused the publication of making up the story. The Astros later fired Taubman, retracted their statement and issued an apology.

Postseason

Game log 

|- style="background:#cfc;"
| 1 || October 4 || Rays || 6–2 || Verlander (1–0) || Glasnow (0–1) || — || 43,360 || 1–0 || W1
|- style="background:#cfc;"
| 2 || October 5 || Rays || 3–1 || Cole (1–0) || Snell (0–1) || Harris (1) || 43,378 || 2–0 || W2
|- style="background:#fbb;"
| 3 || October 7 || @ Rays || 3–10 || Morton (1–0) || Greinke (0–1) || — || 32,251 || 2–1 || L1
|- style="background:#fbb;"
| 4 || October 8 || @ Rays || 1–4 || Yarbrough (1–0) || Verlander (1–1) || Snell (1) || 32,178 || 2–2 || L2
|- style="background:#cfc;"
| 5 || October 10 || Rays || 6–1 || Cole (2–0) || Glasnow (0–2) || — || 43,418 || 3–2 || W1
|-

|- style="background:#fbb;"
| 1 || October 12 || Yankees || 0–7 || Tanaka (1–0) || Greinke (0–1) || — || 43,311 || 0–1 || L1
|- style="background:#cfc;"
| 2 || October 13 || Yankees || 3–2  || James (1–0) || Happ (0–1) || — || 43,359 || 1–1 || W1
|- style="background:#cfc;"
| 3 || October 15 || @ Yankees || 4–1 || Cole (1–0) || Severino (0–1) || Osuna (1) || 48,998 || 2–1 || W2 
|- style="text-align:center; background:#bbb
| — || October 16 || @ Yankees || colspan=7 | Postponed (Inclement Weather, makeup date on October 17)
|- style="background:#cfc;"
| 4 || October 17 || @ Yankees || 8–3 || Pressly (1–0) || Tanaka (1–1) || — || 49,067 || 3–1 || W3
|- style="background:#fbb;"
| 5 || October 18 || @ Yankees || 1–4 || Paxton (1–0) || Verlander (0–1) || Chapman (1) || 48,483 || 3–2 || L1
|- style="background:#cfc;"
| 6 || October 19 || Yankees || 6–4 || Osuna (1–0) || Chapman (0–1) || — || 43,357 || 4–2 || W1 
|-

|-style="background:#fbb;"
| 1 || October 22 || Nationals || 4–5 || Scherzer (1–0) || Cole (0–1) || Doolittle (1) || 43,339 || 0–1 || L1
|-style="background:#fbb;"
| 2 || October 23 || Nationals || 3–12 || Strasburg (1–0) || Verlander (0–1) || — || 43,357 || 0–2 || L2
|-style="background:#cfc;"
| 3 || October 25 || @ Nationals || 4–1 || James (1–0) || Sánchez (0–1) || Osuna (1) || 43,867 || 1–2 || W1
|-style="background:#cfc;"
| 4 || October 26 || @ Nationals || 8–1 || Urquidy (1–0) || Corbin (0–1) || — || 43,889 || 2–2 || W2
|-style="background:#cfc;"
| 5 || October 27 || @ Nationals || 7–1 || Cole (1–1) || Ross (0–1) || — || 43,910 || 3–2 || W3
|-style="background:#fbb;" 
| 6 || October 29 || Nationals || 2–7 || Strasburg (2–0) || Verlander (0–2) || — || 43,384 || 3–3 || L1
|-style="background:#fbb;"  
| 7 || October 30 || Nationals || 2–6 || Corbin (1–1) || Harris (0–1) || — || 43,326 || 3–4 || L2
|-

Postseason rosters

| style="text-align:left" | 
Pitchers: 20 Wade Miley 21 Zack Greinke 30 Héctor Rondón 35 Justin Verlander 36 Will Harris 38 Joe Smith 39 Josh James 45 Gerrit Cole 54 Roberto Osuna 55 Ryan Pressly 65 José Urquidy
Catchers: 12 Martín Maldonado 28 Robinson Chirinos
Infielders: 1 Carlos Correa 2 Alex Bregman 10 Yuli Gurriel 16 Aledmys Díaz 27 José Altuve
Outfielders: 3 Kyle Tucker 4 George Springer 6 Jake Marisnick 22 Josh Reddick 23 Michael Brantley 26 Myles Straw
Designated hitters: 44 Yordan Álvarez
|- valign="top"

| style="text-align:left" | 
Pitchers: 21 Zack Greinke 30 Héctor Rondón 35 Justin Verlander 36 Will Harris 38 Joe Smith 39 Josh James 41 Brad Peacock 45 Gerrit Cole 54 Roberto Osuna 55 Ryan Pressly 65 José Urquidy 66 Bryan Abreu
Catchers: 12 Martín Maldonado 28 Robinson Chirinos
Infielders: 1 Carlos Correa 2 Alex Bregman 10 Yuli Gurriel 16 Aledmys Díaz 27 José Altuve
Outfielders: 3 Kyle Tucker 4 George Springer 6 Jake Marisnick 22 Josh Reddick 23 Michael Brantley 
Designated hitters: 44 Yordan Álvarez
|- valign="top"

| style="text-align:left" |
Pitchers: 21 Zack Greinke 30 Héctor Rondón 35 Justin Verlander 36 Will Harris 38 Joe Smith 39 Josh James 41 Brad Peacock 45 Gerrit Cole 47 Chris Devenski 54 Roberto Osuna 55 Ryan Pressly 65 José Urquidy
Catchers: 12 Martín Maldonado 28 Robinson Chirinos
Infielders: 1 Carlos Correa 2 Alex Bregman 10 Yuli Gurriel 16 Aledmys Díaz 27 José Altuve
Outfielders: 3 Kyle Tucker 4 George Springer 6 Jake Marisnick 22 Josh Reddick 23 Michael Brantley 
Designated hitters: 44 Yordan Álvarez
|- valign="top"

Awards and achievements

Grand Slams

Awards

American League statistical leaders

Roster

Farm system

See also

 List of Major League Baseball 100 win seasons
 List of Major League Baseball annual ERA leaders
 List of Major League Baseball annual saves leaders
 List of Major League Baseball annual strikeout leaders
 List of Major League Baseball annual wins leaders
 List of Major League Baseball franchise postseason streaks
 List of Major League Baseball no-hitters
 List of Major League Baseball pitchers who have thrown an immaculate inning

References

External links
Houston Astros season official site 
2019 Houston Astros season at Baseball Reference

Houston Astros seasons
Houston Astros
Houston Astros
American League West champion seasons
American League champion seasons